Francisco Romero (1700–1763) was a significant Spanish matador. He reputedly introduced the famous red cape (muleta) into bullfighting in around 1726.

He was the founding father of a bullfighting dynasty, fundamental for bullfighting history. He was apparently the inventor of several characteristics that started to be used in a key period for bullfighting when the modern on foot system was defined, as the use of the muleta (cape) and estoque (sword) to kill the bull face to face. He was the father of Juan Romero, also a bullfighter, and grandfather of Pedro Romero.

During the first years of the 18th century, at Ronda, Francisco Romero, at the end of a bullfight, asked for permission to kill the bull by himself. Up to this moment, only nobles mounted on horses fought bulls. That afternoon, after provoking the bull a couple of times with a linen, Francisco Romero killed the bull with his sword. He soon repeated this process at other bullrings and became an authentic professional, giving birth to the modern style of on foot bullfighting. The use of linens (white ones and hanging from a stick) could have been done before Romero's feat. Those linens evolved step by step towards the modern muleta or red cape and capote or purple and yellow cape, but it is very plausible that was Romero the one that popularized his use as the bullfight essential prop.

It seems that the death of a bull by sword was practiced previously, especially by the employees of meat processing factories in Sevilla, but not in a bullring. In any case, if Francisco Romero is not the inventor of the modern bullfight, he is the first matador that became professional and made a living from bull fighting. His success implied a fundamental and radical change in the bullfight art: up to him, the main part of the corrida (bullfight or bullrun) was the piking of the bull from a horse, followed by bullfighting on horse and then some use of cape by helpers on foot, but the horse rider was the protagonist of the bull party. The death of the bull was only the end of the bullfight and it wasn't particularly celebrated. After Francisco Romero, and after some years when both bullfighting styles (on foot and riding a horse) fought for public support, on-horse bullfight started to lose the protagonist role it had and the death of the bull by a lonely man on foot, armed only with a sword, became the most important part of a bullfight.

External links
 Francisco Romero - Encyclopaedia Britannica

Spanish bullfighters
People from Ronda
Sportspeople from the Province of Málaga
1763 deaths
1700 births